The Teenage Mutant Ninja Turtles video games have been produced since 1989, largely by Japanese video game manufacturer Konami.

Earlier games were mostly based on the 1987 TV series, with elements borrowed from the movies, the Teenage Mutant Ninja Turtles Adventures, action figures and the original Mirage comic books and role-playing books. Several games released in the 2000s were based on the 2003 TV series and the 2007 film. A number of games released in the following decade have been based on the 2012 TV series, the 2014 film, and Rise of the Teenage Mutant Ninja Turtles.

List

See also
 List of video games based on comics

References

Further reading
 "Free Fan-Made Teenage Mutant Ninja Turtle Game Is A Fun Throw-Back", Kotaku

Teenage Mutant Ninja Turtles Video Games
Windows games
Teenage Mutant Ninja Turtles Video Games
Android (operating system) games
Teenage Mutant Ninja Turtles Video Games
Video games about ninja
 
Teenage Mutant Ninja Turtles
Video game franchises introduced in 1989
Video games